The 2012 Rome Rampage season was the first season for the United Indoor Football League (UIFL) franchise.

On March 5, 2011, it was announced that indoor American football would be returning to Rome, Georgia in the form of the Rome River Dogs. On May 24, 2011, the River Dogs announced that they would be changing their name to the Rome Rampage, and that they would be playing at the Forum Civic Center. On May 31, 2011, the Rampage introduced Joe Micco as the franchise's first ever head coach.

Schedule
Key:

Regular season
All start times are local to home team

Standings

y - clinched conference title
x - clinched playoff spot

References

Rome Rampage
Georgia Rampage
American football in Georgia (U.S. state)